This is the calendar for Old Style 1751, which began on Monday, 25 March, in England (and related regions). The Old Style year 1751 ended on 31 December, unlike England's typical Old Style calendar, which ended with the following March, on 24 March. Hence, 1751 was the final year to begin on 25 March, and Old Style 1752 began on 1 January (Wednesday), in England, Wales, Ireland, or the American colonies (etc.), as a transition year to the New Style (N.S.) Gregorian calendar. However, both calendars had been in dual use in some regions, for many years.

|-

|-

|-

Note that Scotland already used a calendar beginning 1 January to 31 December, as adopted since 1600, while England (and related regions) had continued to begin the new year on 25 March, until 1752.

See also 
 Old Style common year starting on Monday - for similar years
 Old Style 1752 - transition year to Gregorian calendar
 1753 - first full Gregorian year in England (and related regions)

References

Julian calendar